Dave Stala (born October 25, 1979) is a former professional Canadian football slotback who played in the Canadian Football League (CFL). He was originally drafted in the 6th round, 50th overall by the Montreal Alouettes as a placekicker in 2003. He played CIS football for the Saint Mary's Huskies. After injury-plagued seasons in 2007 and 2008, he signed with the Hamilton Tiger-Cats in 2009 and rejuvenated his career in his hometown. Stala is well known for a unique soccer-inspired touchdown celebration which he performed on July 31, 2010. After five seasons with the Tiger-Cats, Stala was released by the club on January 9, 2014. He re-signed with Montreal the next day to a two-year contract, reuniting him with the team that drafted him.

Dave Stala is often referred to by the nicknames "Sticky Stala" or just "Sticky".

Statistics

Further reading

References

External links
Toronto Argonauts bio 
Montreal Alouettes bio 

1979 births
Living people
Canadian football slotbacks
Canadian people of Polish descent
Canadian players of Canadian football
Players of Canadian football from Ontario
Polish players of Canadian football
Hamilton Tiger-Cats players
Montreal Alouettes players
Saint Mary's Huskies football players
People from Myślenice
Sportspeople from Lesser Poland Voivodeship
Toronto Argonauts players